Grainger is a crater on Mercury.  Its name was adopted by the International Astronomical Union (IAU) in 2012, after  the Australian-born composer George Percy Aldridge Grainger.

Grainger has a rather prominent central peak, which rises above much of the rim of the crater.

There are irregular depressions with a halo of high-albedo material in the northeast quadrant of the crater, which may be volcanic in nature.

The large Rembrandt basin is to the northwest of Grainger, and to the northeast is Beckett crater.

References

Impact craters on Mercury